The 1928 Chico State Wildcats football team represented Chico State Teachers College—now known as California State University, Chico—as a member of the  California Coast Conference (CCC) during the 1928 college football season. Led by sixth-year head coach Art Acker, Chico State compiled an overall record of 2–6 with a mark of 1–4 in conference play, placing eighth in the CCC. The team was outscored by its opponents 118 to 105 for the season. The Wildcats played home games at College Field in Chico, California.

This was Chico State's last season in the CCC. They joined the Far Western Conference (FWC)—later known as the Northern California Athletic Conference (NCAC)—in 1929 and remained a member until the school eliminated the football program after the 1996 season.

Schedule

References

Chico State
Chico State Wildcats football seasons
Chico State Wildcats football